Duarte Cove is the 6 km embayment indenting for 4.9 km Danco Coast between Sladun Peninsula and Relyovo Peninsula.  Entered south of Cierva Point and north of Renzo Point.

The feature is named after Captain José Duarte, commander of the transport ship Maipo in the 1949 Chilean Antarctic expedition.

Location

British mapping in 1978.

Maps
 British Antarctic Territory.  Scale 1:200000 topographic map.  DOS 610 Series, Sheet W 64 60.  Directorate of Overseas Surveys, UK, 1978.
 Antarctic Digital Database (ADD). Scale 1:250000 topographic map of Antarctica. Scientific Committee on Antarctic Research (SCAR). Since 1993, regularly upgraded and updated.

References
 Ensenada Duarte . SCAR Composite Antarctic Gazetteer.

Coves of Graham Land
Danco Coast